International Day of Non-Violence is observed on 2 October, the birthday of Mahatma Gandhi. It was established on 15 June 2007 according to United Nations General Assembly resolution A/RES/61/271. The day is an occasion to "disseminate the message of non-violence...through education and public awareness...and reaffirm the desire for a culture of peace, tolerance, understanding and non-violence". It is not a public holiday, but is observed around the world in various ways, often to draw attention to global issues. Its date and purpose correspond with those of the Indian national public holiday of Gandhi Jayanti.

Background
In January 2004, Iranian Nobel laureate Shirin Ebadi had taken a proposal for an International Day of Non-Violence from a Hindi teacher in Paris teaching international students to the World Social Forum in Mumbai. The idea gradually attracted the interest of some leaders of India's Congress Party ("Ahimsa Finds Teen Voice", The Telegraph, Calcutta) until a Satyagraha Conference resolution in New Delhi in January 2007, initiated by Indian National Congress President and Chairperson of the United Progressive Alliance Sonia Gandhi and Archbishop Desmond Tutu, called upon the United Nations to adopt the idea.

On 15 June 2007, the United Nations General Assembly voted to establish 2 October as the International Day of Non-Violence. The resolution by the General Assembly asks all members of the UN system to commemorate 2 October in "an appropriate manner and disseminate the message of non-violence, including through education and public awareness".

The United Nations Postal Administration (UNPA) in New York City prepared a special cachet to commemorate this event, following a request from the Indian Ambassador at the Permanent Mission of India to the UN. The boxed pictorial cachet design was prepared by the UNPA and was limited to cancellation at UNPA's NY location (not Geneva and Vienna). The UNPA has indicated that all outgoing UNPA mail between 2 and 31 October carried the cachet.

See also 
International Day of Peace
Gandhi Jayanti
Mahatma Gandhi

References

External links

Information on various philatelic material related to Mohandas K. Gandhi 
International Day of Non-violence Speech 

October observances
Non-Violence, International Day of
Mahatma Gandhi
Nonviolence
Recurring events established in 2007